Ottawa station is the primary train station in Ottawa, Ontario, Canada. It could also be:

 Ottawa Central Station, the former intercity bus terminal in Ottawa, Ontario, Canada
 Ottawa station (Rock Island Line), a former station in Ottawa, Illinois
 Tremblay station, a rapid transit station adjacent to Ottawa station
 Old Depot Museum, a historic train station and museum in Ottawa, Kansas, United States
 Senate of Canada Building, formerly Ottawa Union Station